John Barnard Swett Jackson  (June 5, 1806 – January 6, 1879) was an American surgeon and pathologist. He was the first curator of the Warren Anatomical Museum and was dean of Harvard Medical School from 1853 to 1855. In 1854, the Shattuck Professorship of Morbid Anatomy at Harvard Medical School was created for him. He held the post from then until his death in 1879, when the position was renamed the Shattuck Professorship of Pathological Anatomy. He was a member of the Boston Society for Medical Improvement.

Jackson graduated from Harvard Medical School in 1829.  Jackson married Emily Jane Andrews in 1853  and they had two sons together, Henry and Robert Tracy.  He died of pneumonia on January 6, 1879 in Boston.

References

 
 J. G. Mumford, M.D. The Story of the Boston Society for Medical Improvement, (Boston: Damrell & Upsham Publishers, 1901)

External links

 A descriptive catalogue of the anatomical museum of the Boston Society for Medical Improvement
 Papers of John Barnard Swett Jackson
 Dissection of Two Adult Dromedaries
 Dissection of a Spermaceti Whale and Three Other Cetaceans

1806 births
1879 deaths
Deaths from pneumonia in Massachusetts
American anatomists
American curators
Harvard Medical School alumni